Stanley Blair (born July 4, 1964) is a former all-star and Grey Cup champion Canadian Football League cornerback.

Coming out of the Southeastern Oklahoma State University football program, Blair joined the Edmonton Eskimos in 1987 and took the CFL by storm, capturing the Jackie Parker Trophy as best rookie in the West and winning a Grey Cup. His blocked kick in the 75th Grey Cup classic was instrumental. He played two more seasons in Edmonton and was selected as an all-star in each. He was courted by many National Football League teams, but signed with the Phoenix Cardinals and played only 5 games with them before injuries ended his career.

References

External links
Just Sports Stats

1964 births
Living people
Players of American football from Arkansas
American football defensive backs
Canadian football defensive backs
Edmonton Elks players
Phoenix Cardinals players
African-American players of American football
African-American players of Canadian football
Canadian Football League Rookie of the Year Award winners
Southeastern Oklahoma State Savage Storm football players
Sportspeople from Pine Bluff, Arkansas
21st-century African-American people
20th-century African-American sportspeople